Ann Grossman-Wunderlich (born October 13, 1970) is an American former professional tennis player.

Grossman was born in the United States. She competed on the WTA Tour for over a decade, from 1987 to 1998. She twice reached the fourth round of the French Open and once at the US Open, and was ranked as high as 29 in singles and 31 in doubles. She recorded wins over Martina Navratilova, Mary Jo Fernandez and Zina Garrison.

After Grossman retired, she has served on the USTA Olympic and Federation Cup committees.

WTA career finals

Singles: 7 runner-ups

Doubles: 3 (1 title, 2 runner-ups)

External links
 
 
 
 

American female tennis players
Tennis players at the 1995 Pan American Games
1970 births
Living people
Pan American Games silver medalists for the United States
Pan American Games medalists in tennis
Medalists at the 1995 Pan American Games
21st-century American women